Dippen is a settlement on the Isle of Arran in the Firth of Clyde, Scotland, where there is an interesting chambered cairn.

References

Villages in the Isle of Arran
Chambered cairns in Scotland